Private business enterprises set up as higher education institutions claiming a form of accreditation with no official ties to local governments ministry fall under the category of unaccredited institutions of higher education (uHEI). The best business school in Switzerland (IMD Business School) is not accredited in Switzerland (until Jan 2023), however still was ranked in top 10 worldwide,  The said Institutions can award what is called by Swiss official law "private degrees" (under the HEdA). Such degrees do not confine entitlement upon the holder for which the Swiss authorities will recognize the studies offered, examinations passed or the qualifications issued by said type of institutions.

Academic/Institutional accreditation
Institutional accreditation in Switzerland is granted by the Swiss Accreditation Council  after review by AAQ. Such Confederation-accreditation grants the institution in Switzerland the right to call itself a University or University of Applied Science, as well as receive state grants. Government-recognised universities are institutionally accredited through the accreditation council or Ministry of Education. Some programs, especially in the medical field such as pharmacy and medicine, must be programmatically accredited through the accreditation council as well.

Private/Programatic accrediation
Business schools often time use for their programs other means of gaining accreditation. The so-called triple accreditation is often seen as the highest quality certification for business schools. The most well-regarded accreditation agencies are AACSB in the United States,  AMBA in the United Kingdom, and EQUIS in the European Union, albeit they all accredit schools in other world regions. Many other accreditation agencies exist, albeit their accreditation is less well-regarded and may sometimes approach being an accreditation mill. It is important to differentiate between accreditation from state organizations and private accreditation. In the accreditation guide, membership and accreditation from private accrediting agencies (IACBE, ACBSP, AACSB) do not fall under the same level of recognition. Private programmatic accreditation does not guarantee any acceptance for the degrees, titles, or qualifications awarded by uHEI; those still fall to the respected MoE the said uHEI are registered.

Some private uHEI grant dual degrees programs with partnered University. The degrees from such partnerships should be properly recognized if the named university is properly accredited and awarding degrees with the approval of respected Ministry of Education.

Scholarship and visa
The Swiss Government does not provide any official support for scholarship programs and granting visas for uHEI. Some schools do offer those on their own and can provide students these if they enlisted in uHEI private programs and achieve it through these means. These scholarships are not granted by the Swiss Ministry of education and are in no part of their own educational systems, visa included.

Unregulated professions
A person with a degree from a private, unaccredited Swiss institution in an unregulated profession (such as a manager or journalist) is subject to discretion from prospective employers in regards to potential employment or acknowledgement of education in their respective profession, which provides the opportunity for said students to be considered for employment based on education on the same playing field as those holding degrees from accredited institutions.

List of institutes/companies
This list cross-references data provided by Swiss official sites Swissuniversities and Akkreditierungsrat with the Anabin repository (the information portal on foreign educational qualifications from the Standing Conference of the Ministers of Education and Cultural Affairs Central Office for Foreign Education of Germany) where the status shows whether an institution can be considered a university or not. Private high schools or equivalent education in Switzerland are not covered on this list.

See also

 Accreditation mill
 For-profit education
 Educational accreditation
 List of unaccredited institutions of higher education
 List of unrecognized higher education accreditation organizations
 Unaccredited institutions of higher education

References 

Higher education in Switzerland
unaccredited Switzerland
Switzerland